Anthranilate 3-hydroxylase may refer to:

 Anthranilate 3-monooxygenase (FAD), an enzyme
 Anthranilate 3-monooxygenase, an enzyme